The badminton men's team tournament at the 1986 Asian Games in Seoul took place from 27 September to 29 September.

Schedule
All times are Korea Standard Time (UTC+09:00)

Results

Quarterfinals

Semifinals

Final

Non-participating athletes

References
 Quarterfinals results
 Semifinals results
 Final results

Men's team